The National Youth Poet Laureate is a title held in the United States by a young person who demonstrates skill in the arts, particularly poetry and/or spoken word, is a strong leader, is committed to social justice, and is active in civic discourse and advocacy. It is a title awarded annually to one winner among four finalists, most of whom have been chosen as the Poet Laureate for their city and region.

The national competition for Youth Poet Laureate is held in May at various distinguished locations, from the Library of Congress to the Kennedy Center, and is judged by a panel of esteemed poets and writers. In its six years of existence, the award has been granted to six teens, Amanda Gorman of Los Angeles in 2017, Patricia Frazier of Chicago in 2018, Kara Jackson also of Chicago in 2019, Meera Dasgupta of New York City in 2020, Alexandra Huyhn of San Francisco in 2021, and Alyssa Gaines of Indianapolis in 2022.

To be chosen as the National Youth Poet Laureate, young people who have served as Youth Poet Laureates in their own cities go through an in-depth application process that includes evaluation of their work, poetry and artistic skills, as well as their in-school and extracurricular activities. These activities collectively must show a desire and action to improve and engage their communities. In addition to recognizing the talents of a young generation, the National Youth Poet Laureate program attempts to create spaces for young people to participate in political and cultural conversations of their time. During their year of holding the title of National Youth Poet Laureate, the poet attends events across the country doing readings and advocating for young people to participate in the expression of themselves and their generation through literature and poetry.



Founding 
The National Youth Poet Laureate program was founded in 2016 by the Urban Word NYC organization, a youth program that provides opportunities for learning creative writing, poetry, spoken word, college prep, literature, and hip-hop to support development and engagement among young adults. The national program is co-sponsored by other local and national organizations that support youth literacy, including Youth Speaks, The President's Committee on the Arts & Humanities, The Academy of American Poets, Poetry Society of America, Cave Canem, and the Library of Congress. Urban Word NYC began the program in 2009 alongside NYC Votes in 2009 after seeing young people get more involved and inspired in civic activity after the election of Barack Obama. Their mission then spread to 50 other cities, states, and regions. In 2016, the organization partnered with the President's Committee on the Arts & Humanities to make it a national title.

The National Youth Poet Laureate is loosely connected to the United States Poet Laureate in that they are both sponsored by the Library of Congress. However, the US Poet Laureate is chosen by the Librarian of Congress rather than through a competition. They serve from June to May for a single term. The US Poet Laureate is often an adult poet who writes for a more general audience and advocates for the reading and awareness of poetry. Additionally, the National Youth Poet Laureate award is not officially associated with the Young People's Poet Laureate, a title given by the Poetry Foundation to an adult poet who writes for children. The Young People's Poet Laureate serves for two years and recommends poetry for children to teachers, schools, librarians, and other educators each month.

Ceremony 
In awarding the National Youth Poet Laureate title, five finalists are selected from a pool of more than thirty-five applicants who serve as their respective city or regional Poet Laureate. In the spirit of National Poetry Month, the five finalists perform their poetry in a ceremonial reception at the Library of Congress in April. The finalists perform before a panel of esteemed judges who reflect and embody the power of verse. In 2018 and 2019, the panel included Juan Felipe Herrera, a former U.S. Poet Laureate from 2015 to 2017. Elizabeth Acevedo, the National Book Award Winner for 2018, was also among the panel of judges in 2019.

The ceremony to announce the winner usually involves a few of the finalists reading poetry and appearances and speeches from notable poets. In 2017, finalists read with the 2018–2019 National Ambassador for Young People's Literature, Jacqueline Woodson. In 2018, finalists were introduced by American Book Prize winner Kimiko Hahn and four-time National Poetry Slam champion Patricia Smith. In 2019, the event was hosted by poet Mahogany L. Browne.

The Library of Congress records and archives the celebration and recognition ceremony of the awarded individual.

Finalists and winners 

Amanda Gorman of Los Angeles was 19 when she was awarded the title of first National Youth Poet Laureate in 2017. She writes about race, gender politics, growing up in Los Angeles and the changes the city has seen in her lifetime. She attended Harvard University.  She became the youngest poet to read at a presidential inauguration, reciting her poem "The Hill We Climb" at the inauguration of Joe Biden on January 20, 2021. 

Patricia Frazier of Chicago was 19 when she became the second National Youth Poet Laureate in 2018. She writes about gentrification of Chicago, her childhood, her grandmother, and other issues affecting young queer and diverse people. She attends Columbia College Chicago.

Kara Jackson of Chicago was 19 when she became the third National Youth Poet Laureate in 2019. She writes about being on the cusp of childhood and adulthood and what it means to be a prison abolitionist. She attends Smith College.

Meera Dasgupta of New York City was 16 when she became the fourth and the youngest National Youth Poet Laureate in 2020. She is an advocate for student voice and gender equality, having worked throughout the city on various projects in order to empower young women and to increase civic engagement within other students her age. 

Alexandra Huynh became the fifth National Youth Poet Laureate in 2021 at the age of 18.  She writes about racial disparity and environmental change and its impact on people.  She is a student at Stanford University. 

Alyssa Gaines of Indianapolis was 18 when she became the sixth National Youth Poet  Laureate of 2022. A recent high school graduate, she attends Harvard University.  She has been engaged in poetry since grammar school. She writes about racial identity.  The poet also won the Indiana Repertory Theater's Young Playwrights in Progress competition in 2020.

References 

American poetry awards
Poet
Library of Congress
2017 establishments in the United States
Awards established in 2017
National Youth Poet Laureate